Gilla Chakradhar (15 June 1974 – 15 December 2014), known professionally as Chakri, was an Indian music composer and singer who worked in Telugu cinema. He won the Filmfare Award for Best Male Playback Singer – Telugu for Satyam (2003) & Nandi Award for Best Music Director for Simha (2010).

Early life
Gilla Chakradhar was born on 15 June 1974 in Kambalapalli, a village of the Mahabubabad district, Telangana.

Career
Chakri is known for composing music. He has been a part of around 85 movies. He started his career as a music director with the Movie Bachi directed by Puri Jagannadh. He won the best singer award for Satyam in the Tollywood Filmfare Awards and a Nandi Award for Simha. He created many musical hits for Ravi Teja and director Puri Jagannadh, working on nine films with the former and ten films with the latter. [citation needed]

Personal life
Chakri married Sravani in 2004, shortly after he divorced his first wife.  He has a brother and 3 sisters.

Death
Chakri died in his sleep on 15 December 2014.  Sravani (his wife) took him to a nearby hospital where he was pronounced dead at around 7:45 AM. Chakri had developed obese-related comorbidities.

Controversies
In 2013, a molestation case was filed against Chakri and producer Paruchuri Prasad on the grounds of allegedly misbehaving with a 36-year-old woman during a party. Police reported that the victim was Chakri's friend and invited him to the party. During the party Chakri and Prasad became intoxicated and "misbehaved with her." The two have been booked under penal provisions for assault on a woman with the intent to outrage her modesty.

Filmography

As music director

References

External links

1974 births
2014 deaths
Telugu film score composers
Kannada film score composers
Telugu playback singers
Filmfare Awards South winners
20th-century Indian composers
Indian male composers
Indian male playback singers
20th-century Indian singers
Film musicians from Andhra Pradesh
21st-century Indian composers
21st-century Indian singers
Musicians from Telangana
People from Hanamkonda district
Male film score composers
20th-century Indian male singers
21st-century Indian male singers